Jenny Lund  (15 February 1916 – 17 February 1998) was a Norwegian politician.

She was elected deputy representative to the Storting for the periods 1954–1957, 1958–1961, 1961–1965 and 1965–1969 for the Labour Party. She replaced Nils Kristian Lysø at the Storting from January 1958 to August 1963, and Olav Gjærevoll in October 1965.

Personal life
Lund was born in Ålen to shoemaker Rasmus Saksgård and Marie Bengtzon.

References

1916 births
1998 deaths
People from Holtålen
Labour Party (Norway) politicians
Members of the Storting